Melissa de la Cruz (born 1971) is a Filipina-American writer known for young adult fiction. Her young-adult series include Au Pairs, the Blue Bloods, and The Beauchamp Family.

Early life and education
Melissa de la Cruz was born in Manila, Philippines and says that she has wanted to be an author since she was eleven years old.

She immigrated to the United States with her family when she was 13, in 1985, and they settled in San Francisco, where she graduated from Convent of the Sacred Heart High School. She went on to study art history and English at Columbia University in New York City. After graduation she worked as a computer consultant.

Personal life
De la Cruz is married to Michael Johnston, another writer, with whom she co-wrote the Heart of Dread series.
They and their daughter live in Los Angeles and Palm Springs, California.

Career
De La Cruz wrote her first full-length novel at 22 while living in New York City and working at Bankers Trust. That novel ultimately didn't sell, but an editor at Little, Brown suggested she become a journalist to work on her professional writing credits. She started working freelance and published her first essay in New York Press in 1996. She also worked as a beauty and fashion editor until she sold her debut novel, The Cat's Meow, in 1998. De la Cruz has published articles in periodicals including The New York Times, Cosmopolitan, Seventeen, Teen Vogue, and Harper's Magazine. After publication of her debut novel in 2001, and layoff from the U.S. investment bank Morgan Stanley, she pursued writing full-time.

Work as a fashion writer for Marie Claire was the inspiration for How to Become Famous in Two Weeks or Less (2003) by de la Cruz and Karen Robinovitz.

Work as a nanny and visits to The Hamptons formed the background for the 2004 to 2007 series The Au Pairs. De la Cruz has also written original novels for Disney's Descendants franchise, with the first published in 2015.

Series
 Au Pairs – featuring three girls working as au pairs in The Hamptons, inaugurated 2004 with The Au Pairs
 Blue Bloods – vampire novel series inaugurated 2006 with Blue Bloods
 The Ashleys – featuring girls who attend an exclusive prep school, inaugurated 2008 with The Ashleys: There's a New Name in School
 The Beauchamp Family – featuring a family of witches in the Blue Bloods universe, inaugurated 2011 with Witches of East End; adapted as 2013–2014 television series Witches of East End
 Wolf Pact – spin-off from Blue Bloods, released September to December 2012 as four short ebooks
 Heart of Dread – co-written with her husband Michael Johnston, inaugurated 2013 with Frozen
 The Ring and the Crown – historical fiction about five young adults embroiled in love, politics, and magic during a London coming-of-age season
 Alex and Eliza – historical fiction following the 18th-century romance between American founding father Alexander Hamilton and his wife Elizabeth Schuyler, from 2017
 29 – contemporary fiction featuring a South Korean teen and her path to finding love, from 2019
 Never After – inaugurated 2020 with The Thirteenth Fairy
 The Queen's Assassin – inaugurated 2020 with The Queen's Assassin

Works
Test

Au Pairs

The Au Pairs (2004)
Skinny Dipping (2005)
Sun-Kissed (2006)
Crazy Hot (2007)

The Ashleys

There's a New Name in School ... (2008)
Jealous? You Know You Are ... (2008)
Birthday Vicious (2008)
Lipgloss Jungle (2008)

Heart of Dread
De la Cruz and her husband Michael Johnston wrote the Heart of Dread trilogy together.
 Frozen (2013)
 Stolen (2014)
 Golden (2016)

The Ring and the Crown

The Ring and the Crown (2014)
The Lily and the Cross (2017)

Disney Descendants 
The Isle of the Lost novels are one series of print books in the Descendants franchiseinaugurated by the 2015 Disney musical fantasy TV film Descendants
The Isle of the Lost (2015)
Return to the Isle of the Lost (2016)
Rise of the Isle of the Lost (2017)
Escape from the Isle of the Lost (2019)

Alex & Eliza

 Alex and Eliza (2017)
 Love & War (2018)
 All for One (2019)

29

 29 Dates (2019)
 29 Boyfriends (2019)

Never After

 The Thirteenth Fairy (2020)
 The Stolen Slippers (2022)
 "The Broken Mirror" (2022)

The Queen's Assassin
 The Queen's Assassin (2020)
 The Queen's Secret (2021)

Blue Bloods universe
 Blue Bloods
 Blue Bloods (2006)
 Masquerade (2007)
 Revelations (2008)
 The Van Alen Legacy (2009)
 Misguided Angel  (2010)
 Bloody Valentine (2010)
 Lost in Time (2011)
 Gates of Paradise (2013)
 Keys to the Repository (2010), "companion novel", or collection

 The Beauchamp Family
 Diary of the White Witch (2012), prequel to the 2011
 Witches of East End (2011)
 Serpent's Kiss (2012)
 Winds of Salem (2013)
Triple Moon (2015)
Double Eclipse (2016)

 Wolf Pact
 Wolf Pact was first published October to December 2012 as four ebooks entitled Wolf Pact: Part One of Four and so on, followed by a paperback first edition of the whole.
 Wolf Pact (2012)

 The New Blue Bloods Coven
 Vampires of Manhattan (2014)
 White Nights (2017)Stand-alone novels Cat's Meow (2001)
 How to Become Famous in Two Weeks or Less (2003), by de la Cruz and Karen Robinovitz
 The Fashionista Files: Adventures in Four-Inch Heels and Faux Pas (2004) 
Fresh off the Boat (2005)
Angels on Sunset Boulevard (2007)
Girl Stays in the Picture (2009)
Surviving High School: A Novel (2016)
Something in Between (2016)
Pride & Prejudice & Mistletoe (2017)
Someone to Love (2018)
Once Upon a River (2018) 
Gotham High (2020)
Jo & Laurie (2020), by Melissa Stohl and de la Cruz 
High School Musical: The Musical: The Series: The Road Trip (2021) 
Cinder & Glass (2022) 
 A Secret Princess (2022, expected June), by Melissa Stohl and de la CruzShort stories' Mistletoe (2006) – anthology with de la Cruz a contributing author
 "Shelter Island", in 666: The Number of the Beast (2007), anthology
 21 Proms (2007), anthology by de la Cruz
 "A Manhattan Love Story", in Girls Who Like Boys Who Like Boys (2007), anthology 
 "Shelter Island", in The Eternal Kiss (2009), anthology
 "Code of Honor", in A Thousand Beginnings and Endings'' (2018), anthology, eds. Ellen Oh and Elsie Chapman

References

External links
 
 Melissa De La Cruz at Twitter
 The Au Pairs(official) 
 Blue Bloods Books(official) 
 
 

1971 births
Living people
Writers from Manila
Writers from San Francisco
American children's writers
Columbia College (New York) alumni
Filipino emigrants to the United States
Schools of the Sacred Heart alumni
American women novelists
American women children's writers
21st-century American novelists
21st-century American women writers
Nannies
American women non-fiction writers
21st-century American non-fiction writers
Filipino domestic workers